The 2008 Conference USA men's soccer tournament was the fourteenth edition of the Conference USA Men's Soccer Tournament. The tournament decided the Conference USA champion and guaranteed representative into the 2008 NCAA Division I Men's Soccer Championship. The tournament was hosted by Southern Methodist University and the games were played at Westcott Field.

Bracket

Schedule

Quarterfinals

Semifinals

Final

Statistics

Goalscorers

Awards

All-Tournament team
Dan Williams, Kentucky
Tim Crone, Kentucky
Jason Griffiths, Kentucky
Blake Brettschneider, South Carolina
Jimmy Maurer, South Carolina
Eric DeFreitas, Tulsa
Ashley McInnes, Tulsa
Joe Salem, Tulsa
Yaron Bacher, UCF
Kevan George, UCF

References

External links
 

Conference USA Men's Soccer Tournament
Sports in the Dallas–Fort Worth metroplex
Tournament
Conference USA Men's Soccer Tournament
Conference USA Men's Soccer Tournament